Rhagoletis conversa is a species of tephritid or fruit flies in the genus Rhagoletis of the family Tephritidae.

References

conversa
Taxa named by Juan Brèthes
Insects described in 1919